Benjamin F. Yack Arena is a 3,000-seat indoor arena located in Wyandotte, Michigan. It is used for ice hockey and ice skating, and was home of the Motor City Metal Jackets of the North American Hockey League and the Wyandotte Figure Skating Club. It has open ice available, as well a number of various events throughout the season.

The arena has  of space for trade shows, conventions, festivals, and other special events. One event is the Spring Fling hosted by the Parish of St. Vincent Pallotti.

References

External links
Yack Arena

Indoor ice hockey venues in the United States
Indoor arenas in Michigan
Sports venues in Michigan